Giancarlo Sbragia (14 March 1926 – 28 June 1994) was an Italian actor, voice actor, stage director and playwright.

Life and career 
Born in Rome, Sbragia graduated at the Silvio d’Amico Academy of Dramatic Arts in 1947, and debuted on stage at the Piccolo Teatro in Milan, with the theatrical company of Giorgio Strehler. He debuted as a playwright in 1953 with the play Le veglie inutili, and in 1956 he debuted as a stage director with the drama Ricorda con rabbia. Between 1958 and 1959 he worked with the theatrical company of Michelangelo Antonioni and Luca Ronconi, and in 1960 he was co-founder, together with Enrico Maria Salerno and Ivo Garrani, of the stage company "Attori Associati". Between the 1960s and the 1970s Sbragia was also very active on television series, notably playing Napoleon in the successful drama series I grandi camaleonti.

Sbragia also devoted himself successfully to theater direction, in which he made his debut directing and interpreting the first Italian edition of Remember with anger by the English playwright John Osborne (season 1957-58). In addition to having ranged over all kinds of texts - from ancient comedies and tragedies to contemporary dramas - he was the author himself: in fact he wrote and staged some works, such as Le veglieutile, Quarta era (with Gian Domenico Giagni, from the investigative book The Sorcerer's Apprentices by Robert Jungk) on the first atomic bomb, The Confessions of Signora Elvira (with Mino Roli), The Fact of June, which recalls the assassination of Giacomo Matteotti, Music and jokes from the commedia dell'arte (with Cesare Brero). 

He was married to Esmeralda Ruspoli, known on stage in the early 1950s, and with whom he had three children: Viola, Ottavio (musician) and Mattia, who continued his parents' business by becoming an actor in turn. 

Giancarlo Sbragia then married the actress Alessandra Panaro in his second marriage, with whom in 1993 he was involved in one of the bomb attacks carried out by Cosa Nostra against the national artistic heritage: in Rome, in fact, the couple lived in front of the church of San Giorgio in Velabro, which was seriously damaged by a car bomb at midnight on 27 July. At the time of the explosion, the two were in the house with the windows open, and this saved them because the shock wave practically went through their apartment, with damage to things, but not to the occupants.

Personal life 
Sbragia was the father of actor Mattia Sbragia. From 1992 until his death, he was married to the actress Alessandra Panaro.

Theater 
In almost fifty years of career, he was part of the main Italian companies, public and private, founding it himself and becoming one of the most significant actors of his generation, "endowed with a style of dry modernity". From the Piccolo Teatro in Milan directed by Strehler (where he made his debut and returned several times) to the Piccolo Teatro in Rome with Orazio Costa, from the National Drama Company with Guido Salvini to the Pagnani-Cervi company; he then worked in the Compagnia Italiana delle Tre Venezie, then with Renzo Ricci and Margherita Bagni, obtaining the name in the company, and collaborated with Michelangelo Antonioni, in the short theatrical interlude experienced by the Ferrara director, giving life to the Antonioni-Sbragia-Vitti company. The turning point came in 1960, when he founded the "Attori Associati" company together with Ivo Garrani and Enrico Maria Salerno, which proposed a research theater with strong social connotations, committed and critical of contemporary reality, staging the first examples of -news in Italy; then he returned for a few seasons to the Piccolo in Milan, then in 1969 he refounded "Gli Associati", this time with the innovative formula of the cooperative ("theatre production body") : still with Garrani but also new adventure companions, actors such as Sergio Fantoni and Valentina Fortunato, the director Virginio Puecher, the set designer Gianni Polidori, the organizer Fulvio Fo (brother of Dario and coming from the Piccolo Teatro in Milan), the -technician Nunzio Meschieri.

It will last until the end of the seventies, enriched with members (Valeria Ciangottini, Renzo Giovampietro, Paola Mannoni, Luigi Vannucchi, Mattia Sbragia) to the point of having, since 1972, two companies. In addition to being an actor and director, Sbragia was also its artistic director. Some memorable shows from those years such as Caligula, Oedipus the King, his personal adaptations of Strange Interlude, Small Town and The Demons; The comedy of Giuseppe Gioacchino Belli by Diego Fabbri.

On the dissolution of the Associates he later declared: "They have simply had their day and it would not make sense to repeat today an experience that has run out because it is linked to certain circumstances, including human ones, which have now changed."

In addition to being an actor, director, translator and text adapter, he also wrote the music for some productions (among others Othello, Caligula, Strange Interlude, The Death of Danton, Sleeping Beauty) being a good pianist from an early age, as he still remembered 60 years after his Academy partner Rossella Falk.

The TV and the radio 
Come già il teatro, Sbragia affrontò la televisione a tutto campo: oltre che attore fu presentatore di programmi e rubriche settimanali, come L'approdo e Concerto di prosa. Ne Promessi sposi (1967) di Sandro Bolchi fu il narratore, che introduceva ogni puntata e riassumeva le precedenti; comparve anche, come molti suoi colleghi, in qualche pubblicità.

On September 8, 1978, on Rete 1, he was live on a touching episode: Rai had invited him to present the airing of his spectacle, the absurd vice, by Diego Fabbri and Davide Lajolo, whose protagonist, Cesare Pavese was played by Luigi Vannucchi, an actor who had committed suicide just ten days earlier (the recording dates back to January 1977); But the Sbragia after a few words at work and on the suicide colleague was taken from the emotion, and stops without being able to continue.

In 1988 RAI broadcast a complete reading of the Divine Comedy, entrusted to Sbragia (Purgatorio), Enrico Maria Salerno (Paradise) and Giorgio Albertazzi (Inferno), the only one made in the history of Italian television.

Sbragia was also very active on the radio, both as a member of RAI's Compagnia di Prosa di Roma (The Barber of Seville by Beaumarchais, The Righteous by Camus), and conducting cultural programs of various kinds and signing adaptations - such as Il giorno della civetta by Leonardo Sciascia in 1967 - and directed, such as an edition of Altri tempi by Pinter, with Fantoni, Fortunato and Valeria Valeri, broadcast by Rai in 1972.

The cinema 
Of lesser importance is his cinematographic activity, despite appearing in over twenty feature films – some directed by valuable directors such as Vittorio Cottafavi and Liliana Cavani, Yves Boisset and Giuseppe Bertolucci – and as narrator in two documentaries. Even on the big screen, however, he crossed all genres, from mythological to detective stories, from historical films to psychological thrillers.

Filmography

References

External links 

 

1926 births
1994 deaths
Italian male film actors
Italian male television actors
Italian male stage actors
Male actors from Rome
20th-century Italian male actors
Accademia Nazionale di Arte Drammatica Silvio D'Amico alumni
Italian dramatists and playwrights
Italian theatre directors
Writers from Rome
People of Lazian descent